Eddie Cunnington (born 12 November 1969) is a Scottish former footballer, who played for Chelsea, Dunfermline, Dumbarton, Glentoran, Coleraine, Hamilton and Ross County.

External links 

1969 births
Living people
Footballers from Bellshill
Association football defenders
Scottish footballers
Chelsea F.C. players
Dunfermline Athletic F.C. players
Dumbarton F.C. players
Glentoran F.C. players
Coleraine F.C. players
Hamilton Academical F.C. players
Ross County F.C. players
English Football League players
Scottish Football League players
NIFL Premiership players